Barry Ward (born 28 September 1961) is a New Zealand cricketer. He played in eight first-class and five List A matches for Canterbury in 1986/87. His father, John Ward, kept wicket for New Zealand in the 1960s.

See also
 List of Canterbury representative cricketers

References

External links
 

1961 births
Living people
New Zealand cricketers
Canterbury cricketers
Cricketers from Timaru